Conical Hill is a  mountain situated in the Nuwara Eliya District of Sri Lanka. It is the 9th highest mountain in Sri Lanka.

See also 
 List of mountains of Sri Lanka

References 

Mountains of Sri Lanka
Landforms of Nuwara Eliya District